The world's thirty busiest airports by cargo traffic for various periods (data provided by Airports Council International). Numbers listed refer to loaded and unloaded freight in metric tonnes, including transit freight.

2021 final statistics
ACI's 2021 final figures released in July 2022 are as follows.

2020 final statistics
ACI's 2020 final figures released in November 2021 are as follows.

2019 final statistics
ACI's 2019 preliminary figures released in May 2020 are as follows.

2018 final statistics
ACI's 2018 final figures released in September 2019 are as follows.

2017 final statistics
ACI's 2017 final figures are as follows.

2016 final statistics 
ACI's 2016 final figures are as follows.

2015 statistics
ACI's 2015 figures are as follows.

2014 statistics
ACW's 2014 figures are as follows.

2013 preliminary statistics

ACI's 2013 preliminary full year figures are as follows.

1. Volume includes transit freight

2012 preliminary statistics

ACI's 2012 preliminary full year figures are as follows.

1. Volume includes transit freight

2011 preliminary statistics

ACI's 2011 preliminary full year figures are as follows.

1. Volume includes transit freight

2010 preliminary statistics

ACI's 2010 preliminary full year figures are as follows.

1. Volume includes transit freight

2009 final statistics
ACI's 2009 final full year figures are as follows.

1. Volume includes transit freight

2008 final statistics
ACI's 2008 final full year figures are as follows.

1. Volume includes transit freight

2007 final statistics
ACI's final full year figures are as follows.

1. Volume includes transit freight

2006 final statistics
ACI's final full year figures are as follows.

1. Volume includes transit freight

2005 final statistics
ACI's final full year figures are as follows.

1. Volume includes transit freight

2004 final statistics
ACI's final full year figures are as follows.

1. Volume includes transit freight

2003 final statistics
ACI's final full year figures are as follows.

1. Volume includes transit freight

2002 final statistics
ACI's final full year figures are as follows.

1. Volume includes transit freight

See also

List of busiest airports by international passenger traffic
List of busiest airports by passenger traffic
List of busiest airports by aircraft movements
Largest cargo airports in the United States

References

External links
Airports Council International
 Air Cargo World

 Cargo traffic
Airports